The Gilbertsville Academy and Collegiate Institute was a school located in Gilbertsville, New York. Founded in 1840, it operated as a private school until 1910, after which it was transferred to the public school system. It continued in use as a school until 1935. The school building still stands, though greatly modified, and is a contributing structure to the Gilbertsville Historic District.

References

Schools in Otsego County, New York